Johan Nås (born 9 February 1983) is a Norwegian football defender and striker.

Nås hails from Eide. He played for SK Træff in 2003, when his transfer to Lørenskog IF was announced. He scored 24 league goals in the 2004 season, and was subsequently purchased by first-tier club Molde FK. However, he flopped greatly, playing only one Norwegian top division game, in 2005, as an 86th-minute substitute.

In early 2006 he joined Follo FK. Since Follo were relegated, he joined Kongsvinger IL in early 2007; however, he returned after half a year. In August 2008 he was loaned out to Ullensaker/Kisa IL for the remainder of the season, In 2009, he joined Strømmen IF.

In 2012, he went on to Frigg Oslo FK.

References

1983 births
Living people
Sportspeople from Møre og Romsdal
Norwegian footballers
Eliteserien players
Norwegian First Division players
SK Træff players
Molde FK players
Kongsvinger IL Toppfotball players
Follo FK players
Ullensaker/Kisa IL players
Strømmen IF players
Frigg Oslo FK players
Association football forwards
Association football defenders